Government House is a heritage-listed official residence at Qantas Close, West Island, Cocos (Keeling) Islands, Australia. It was added to the Australian Commonwealth Heritage List on 22 June 2004.

History 

Government House was constructed in  1953 as part of the Australian Government representation on the Cocos (Keeling) Islands. Although part of the West Island Housing Precinct, Government House is significantly different from the other Australian Government houses on the island.

Description

Government House is located on the ocean front at the southern end of the West Island housing precinct. It is set in an attractive garden landscape setting with open grasslands, palm trees and other specimen plantings of tropical vegetation.

Government House is a large single-storey asbestos elevated building clad with asbestos sheeting. There is a separate garage and a brick guest house originally an asbestos clad structure. There is a formal driveway with white painted edges, a flag pole, fencing and the house it set up for formal entertaining. The site is enclosed with a white timber fence and has a formal entry with large trees planted at the entrance.

In 2000 the condition of the house was assessed as good, although it is not currently used as a permanent residence. The garden and fence require some attention.

Heritage listing 

Government House is significant as an early house constructed for the Australian Government representative on the Cocos (Keeling) Islands. The presence of the Australian Government assisted the self determination of the Cocos Malay people. The house is significant as the catalyst for the development of the West Island settlement which grew after Government House was located on West Island. After 1953 other government, administrative and hospital quarters were constructed.

Government House is a significant variant on other early Australian Government houses on the Cocos (Keeling) Islands. It features a similar design, suited to local climatic conditions and includes a formal driveway with white painted edges, fencing, a flag pole and area for entertaining. It is sited with ocean frontage.

References

Bibliography

Attribution 

Commonwealth Heritage List places in the Cocos (Keeling) Islands
West Island, Cocos (Keeling) Islands
Official residences in Australia
Houses in the Cocos (Keeling) Islands
Articles incorporating text from the Australian Heritage Database
1953 establishments in Australia
Buildings and structures completed in 1953